Johannes Friedrich may refer to:

Johannes Friedrich (bishop) (born 1948), German Lutheran bishop
Johannes Friedrich (linguist) (1893–1972), German hittitologist

See also
Johann Friedrich (theologian) (1836–1917), German theologian
Johann Friedrich, Duke of Pomerania
Johann Frederick, Duke of Württemberg
John Friedrich (disambiguation)
John Frederick (disambiguation)